The three-lined salamander (Eurycea guttolineata) is a species of salamander in the family Plethodontidae. It is endemic to the south-eastern United States.

Description 
Eurycea guttolineata is a mid-sized, slender stream salamander which ranges from about 10-15.9 cm in its adult form. It is tan to light yellow with three black longitudinal stripes running from the eyes down the length of the body to the tail. The tail is very long at approximately two-thirds its total body length. Additionally, the ventrum (belly) of the three-lined salamander is boldly marked with black and white marbling.

Reproduction
Hatchlings are generally around 10-13 mm and undergo metamorphosis when they are 22-27 mm snout-to-vent length. This is typically a 4-6 month larval stage. The effects that elevation has on larval stages have been studied extensively showing that at lower elevations larvae metamorphosized sooner than those at higher elevations which had delayed metamorphosis mostly due to overwintering.

Distribution
The species is distributed throughout much of the southeastern United States. It can be found in the Appalachian Mountains from Virginia and Tennessee south through the Carolinas, Georgia, Alabama, and Mississippi to the Gulf Coast, including eastern Louisiana and western Florida.

Habitat
Its natural habitats are forested floodplains, ditches, streamsides, and seepages. With wet weather, the species may enter wooded terrestrial habitats.

It is not uncommon in suitable habitat. Some subpopulations have likely been extirpated by loss of bottomland hardwood forests.

References

Eurycea
Salamander, Three-lined
Salamander, Three-lined
Salamander, Three-lined
Ecology of the Appalachian Mountains
Natural history of Alabama
Natural history of Louisiana
Natural history of South Carolina
Taxa named by John Edwards Holbrook
Amphibians described in 1838
Taxonomy articles created by Polbot